Cymothoe teita is a butterfly in the family Nymphalidae. It is found in Kenya, from the south-eastern part of the country to the Teita Hills.

References

Butterflies described in 1939
Cymothoe (butterfly)
Endemic insects of Kenya
Butterflies of Africa